Debolt is an unincorporated community in Douglas County, Nebraska, United States, located approximately seven miles northwest of Omaha.

A post office called Debolt  or De Bolt (two words) was established in 1892, and remained in operation until it was discontinued in 1899. The railroad stop on the Chicago & Northwestern line was called De Bolt Place.

See also 
 History of Omaha, Nebraska

References

External links 
 "History of DeBolt, Nebraska" by Adam Fletcher Sasse for NorthOmahaHistory.com

Unincorporated communities in Douglas County, Nebraska
Unincorporated communities in Nebraska